The Mayflower doctrine was a mandate implemented by the U.S. Government Federal Communications Commission (FCC) that required American radio broadcasters to "provide full and equal opportunity for the presentation to the public all sides of public issues". The doctrine was the predecessor of the fairness doctrine that was introduced by the FCC in 1949. 

The FCC believed that broadcasters had a duty to the public because of their position as gatekeepers of the news.  Their belief was that a democratic society should provide maximum opportunity for everyone to express diverse viewpoints on controversial issues and equally important maximum opportunity to hear and read the conflicting view of others.

The Federal Communications Commission was created during President Franklin D. Roosevelt's administration in 1934. Its purpose was to license and renew the license of broadcast stations. However, it was not originally intended to have the power to censor broadcasters' messages. Radio was the main source of mass media during the early- to mid-1900s. The government considered the airwaves that radios used to be in the public domain because there were only a limited number and those that were available were in great demand. “Most serious of the factors weighing against the possibility of balanced editorializing by radio stations is found in the dependency of radio upon advertising for revenues. To the extent to which the sponsor influences program or station policies is impossible to establish”. 

Many people became concerned that the radio would be broadcasting what the conservative business owners approved of instead of serving the people. This prompted FCC chairman Larry Fly, “Fearing a further commercialized, conservative-biased and corporate dominated medium”, to pass the Mayflower doctrine. With the passing of the Mayflower doctrine, the FCC “declared that broadcasters have an obligation to allot a reasonable amount of time to treatment of controversial issues and that they have an affirmative duty to seek, to provide representative expression of all responsible shades of opinion”.

While not intended “to give the commission the power of censorship” the threat of radio broadcasters not being able to renew their license was very real. “Representatives of the Radio industry insisted that the Mayflower Pronouncement is a direct violation of statutory prohibitions against censorship and free speech”. 

World War II made the FCC's policies near unassailable as government censorship of the media was tolerated to help the war effort. After the war in the late 1940s broadcasters began to push back against the Mayflower doctrine framing it “as an infringement of their 1st amendment rights”. They argued “the Mayflower doctrine is invalid as violative of the First Amendment, which prohibits Congress from passing laws abridging the freedom of speech or of the press. Those that defended the Mayflower doctrine considered it a “safeguard of the public”.

In 1948 the FCC  scheduled hearings to debate the legitimacy of the Mayflower doctrine. FCC chairman Clifford Durr tried to rally support for the doctrine. He contacted groups and organizations like the Lawyers Guild and American Jewish Committee who agreed to speak in support of the Mayflower doctrine during the hearings. Letters from Americans across the country also came pouring in supporting Durr. These letters generally followed three themes: fear of broadcasters’ pro-business stance, concern over the ideological imbalance, radio might resemble newspapers when it came to perceived biases and misinformation.

The Mayflower doctrine hearing was held in late March-early April 1948 and had 49 witnesses testify between the two sides. A decision wasn't made until June 2, 1949 when it was ruled that the Mayflower doctrine was to be repealed. The FCC introduced later that year the Fairness doctrine as a replacement..

See also
 Free speech
 Zapple Doctrine

References

Federal Communications Commission